Strážce plamene  (The Flamekeeper) is a compilation album by Czech  recording artists Petr Hapka and Michal Horáček, released on Universal Music in 2006.

Track listing 

Notes
 All songs performed in Czech.
 A  Denotes a track licensed by Česká televize.

Credits and personnel

 Michal Horáček - lyrics, producer
 Petr Hapka - music, producer, lead vocal
 Michal Pekárek - producer, remix, engineer, mastering
 Jaromír Nohavica - lead vocal
 Jana Kirschner - lead vocal
 Daniel Landa - lead vocal
 Bára Basiková - lead vocal

 Hana Hegerová - lead vocal
 František Segrado - lead vocal
 Szidi Tobias - lead vocal
 Mona Martinů - photography
 Oldřich Jelen - illustration
 Lubomír Šedivý - typography

Charts

Albums

Airplay singles

Certifications

Awards

Notes
 B  Won the album Rubikon by Kryštof band.
 C  Won the album Watching Black by Ecstasy of Saint Theresa.
 D  Won the cover of Anna K's album Večernice.

See also
 Strážce plamene v obrazech (DVD release)

References

External links 
 MichalHoracek.cz > Discography > Strážce plamene
 Petr Hapka & Michal Horáček on Euro Pop Music

2006 compilation albums